Sornphet Sornsuphan, or birthname Boonthan Klaylamang (27 March 1948 – 8 January 2022) was a famous Luk thung singer.

Life and career
Sornsuphan finished his education at Primary 4. He started as a performer of Thai music in "" of Dam Daen-Suphan, with Lieang Kanchana who supported him on stage.

Next, he was in khew with Phophin Phornsuphan. Phophin wrote songs for him, and was famous in 1970–1976. His popular music includes "", "", "", "" and "".

From 2010, he had been in poor health, and had not appeared on stage. He died on 8 January 2022, at the age of 73.

Discography









References

External Links
 

1948 births
2022 deaths
Sornphet Sornsuphan
Sornphet Sornsuphan
Sornphet Sornsuphan